X0  may refer to:
 SpaceShipOne flight 15P, the 2004 first privately funded human spaceflight
 X/0, a notation for the division by zero
 Turner syndrome, a disorder in which all or part of an X chromosome is absent
 X0 sex-determination system, as found in some insects
 X0, heterogametic male designation under this system
 X0, a smaller rigged version of an X1 (dinghy)
 X0, running number for N700 Series Shinkansen prototype from 2014 to 2021
 X0, zero-level projection or head in linguistics

See also
 XO (disambiguation)
 X00, a popular DOS-based FOSSIL driver which was commonly used in the mid 1980s to the late 1990s